Ivan Dodig and Austin Krajicek defeated Nicolas Mahut and Édouard Roger-Vasselin in the final, 6–4, 7–6(7–5) to win the doubles tennis title at the 2022 Swiss Indoors.

Jean-Julien Rojer and Horia Tecău were the defending champions from 2019, when the event was last held, but Tecău retired from professional tennis in November 2021. Rojer partnered Marcelo Arévalo, but lost in the quarterfinals to Dodig and Krajicek.

Seeds

Draw

Draw

Qualifying

Seeds

Qualifiers
  Andrey Golubev /  Aleksandr Nedovyesov

Lucky losers
  Nathaniel Lammons /  Jackson Withrow

Qualifying draw

References

External links
Main draw
Qualifying draw

Swiss Indoors - Doubles
2022 Doubles
2022 in Swiss tennis